Paddington was an electoral district of the Legislative Assembly in the Australian state of New South Wales, originally created in 1859, partly replacing Sydney Hamlets. It included the suburbs of Paddington and Redfern. The rest of Sydney's current Eastern Suburbs, which were then rural, were part of Canterbury. With the creation of the electoral districts of South Sydney and Redfern in 1880, Paddington included the northern part of the eastern suburbs, generally east of what is now known as Anzac Parade and north of Rainbow Street, including all of current Woollahra and Waverley and part of Randwick. It elected one member from 1859 to 1880, two members from 1880 to 1885, three members from 1885 to 1889 and four members from 1889 to 1894. With the abolition of multi-member constituencies in 1894, it was replaced by the single-member electorates of Paddington, Waverley, Woollahra and Randwick. In 1920, with the introduction of proportional representation, it was absorbed into Sydney. Paddington was recreated in 1927. In 1959, it was combined with part of Waverley and renamed Paddington-Waverley, which was itself abolished in 1962 and partly replaced by Bligh.

Members for Paddington

Election results

References

Former electoral districts of New South Wales
1859 establishments in Australia
Constituencies established in 1859
1920 disestablishments in Australia
Constituencies disestablished in 1920
1927 establishments in Australia
Constituencies established in 1927
1959 disestablishments in Australia
Constituencies disestablished in 1959